Tulus may refer to:
Tulus (singer), Indonesian singer
Tulus (album), a 2011 album by the singer
Tulus (band), Norwegian band
Tulus (village), village in Azerbaijan